Tsugio is a masculine Japanese given name.

Possible writings
Tsugio can be written using different combinations of kanji characters. Here are some examples:

次雄, "next, masculine"
次男, "next, man"
次夫, "next, husband"
嗣雄, "succession, masculine"
嗣男, "succession, man"
嗣夫, "succession, husband"
継雄, "continue, masculine"
継男, "continue, man"
継夫, "continue, husband"

The name can also be written in hiragana つぎお or katakana ツギオ.

Notable people with the name
, Japanese figure skater.
Tsugio Hattori (ツギオ・ハットリ, 1951–1998), American painter.
, Japanese rower.
, Japanese racing driver.
Tsugio Nakano (中野 次雄, 1910–1999), Japanese judge. 
, Japanese photographer.
, Japanese sport wrestler.

Japanese masculine given names